Beacon Hill may refer to:

Places

Canada
 Beacon Hill, Ottawa, Ontario, a neighbourhood
 Beacon Hill Park, a park in Victoria, British Columbia
 Beacon Hill, Saskatchewan
 Beacon Hill, Montreal, a neighbourhood in Beaconsfield, Quebec

United Kingdom
 Beacon Hill, Buckinghamshire, a village in Buckinghamshire
 Beacon Hill, Frodsham, Frodsham, Cheshire 
 Beacon Hill or Fell, or Penrith Beacon, Penrith, Cumbria
 Beacon Hill, Paignton, the highest point in the unitary authority of Torbay, Devon
 Beacon Hill transmitting station, radio and television transmitters located at Beacon Hill, Marldon, Devon
 Beacon Hill, Dorset, in the hinterland of Poole, Dorset
 Beacon Hill, East Sussex, a Local Nature Reserve in Brighton
 Beacon Hill, Burghclere, Hampshire, a hill fort, Hampshire
 Beacon Hill, Warnford, Hampshire
 Beacon Hill, Lancashire, the location of Jubilee Tower overlooking Darwen, Lancashire
 Beacon Hill, Leicestershire, a country park in Leicestershire
 Beacon Hill, Lincolnshire in the Lincolnshire Wolds, Lincolnshire
 Beacon Hill, Monmouthshire, near Monmouth near the Welsh-English border, Monmouthshire
 Beacon Hill, Norfolk, the highest point in Norfolk
 Beacon Hill, Colkirk, Norfolk, a high point in mid Norfolk
 Beacon Hill, Wollaston, Northamptonshire
 Beacon Hill, Morpeth, Northumberland
 Beacon Hill, Powys, a 547 m hill near Knighton near the Welsh-English border, Powys
 Beacon Hill, Surrey, a settlement near Hindhead, Surrey
 Beacon Hill, Rottingdean, East Sussex
 Beacon Hill, West Sussex near East Harting, West Sussex
 Beacon Hill, Sedgley, known as the Sedgley Beacon, the second-highest point in the West Midlands
 Beacon Hill, Walsall, known as Barr Beacon, West Midlands
 Beacon Hill, Halifax, West Yorkshire
 Beacon Hill, Cranborne Chase, a hill on Cranborne Chase, one of two Beacon Hills in Wiltshire
 Beacon Hill, Salisbury Plain, a hill on Salisbury Plain, one of two Beacon Hills in Wiltshire
 Beacon Hill, one of the Lickey Hills in Worcestershire
 Beacon Hill, Great Totham, highest point in Essex

United States

Communities
 Beacon Hill, Boston, a historic neighborhood in Boston, Massachusetts
 Massachusetts General Court (the state legislature) which meets there
 Beacon Hill, New Jersey, an unincorporated area within Marlboro Township, New Jersey
 Beacon Hill, Seattle, Washington, a hill and neighborhood in Seattle, Washington
 Beacon Hill station (Sound Transit), a Link Light Rail station located in the Beacon Hill neighborhood of Seattle
 Beacon Hill, Cowlitz County, Washington, a census-designated place

Hills
 Beacon Hill (California), in Norco
 Beacon Hill (Branford, Connecticut), the southernmost summit of the Metacomet Ridge

Other places
 Beacon Hill (Antarctica), a hill in Graham Land
 Beacon Hill, New South Wales, a suburb of Sydney, Australia
 Beacon Hill (Hong Kong), a hill in the Kowloon Tong area, Hong Kong
 Beacon Hill, the site of the former coastguard station in Dalkey, a suburb of Dublin, Ireland

Schools
 Beacon Hill School (disambiguation)

Other uses
 Beacon Hill (TV series), a short-lived 1975 American drama set in the Boston neighborhood
 Beacon Hill (web series), a 2014 American drama web series
 Beacon Hill (train), defunct daily rail service from Boston to New Haven, US
 Beacon Hill, a stage of Need for Speed: Underground 2
 Beacon Hills, a fictitious town where MTV's television series Teen Wolf is set

See also
 Beacon, an intentionally conspicuous device designed to attract attention to a specific location
 List of peaks named Signal, a mountain suited to sending and receiving visual signals
 Beacon Fell (disambiguation)
 Signal Hill (disambiguation)
 Signal Mountain (disambiguation)